Michael Wrenford Hooper (born 2 May 1941) is a retired Anglican bishop in the Church of England. He was the suffragan Bishop of Ludlow from 2002 to 2009.

Hooper was educated at the Crypt School in Gloucester and the University of Wales, Lampeter. He was ordained in 1966 and became a curate at St Mary Magdalene's Bridgnorth and was then, successively, priest in charge at Habberley; Rural Dean of Pontesbury, and then Leominster; and finally, before his ordination to the episcopate, the Archdeacon of Hereford. He is married with four children.

References

1941 births
Alumni of the University of Wales, Lampeter
21st-century Church of England bishops
Living people
Archdeacons of Hereford
Bishops of Ludlow